The Frierson House is a historic house at 1112 South Main Street in Jonesboro, Arkansas.  It is a two-story wood-frame structure, with a hip roof pierced by gabled dormers.  The main facade is covered by a two-story porch with Ionic columns, with a single-story porch on the side with Doric columns.  The main entrance is flanked by sidelight windows and topped by a multilight transom, and is set in a recessed paneled entry framed by pilasters.  Its construction date is uncertain, but is placed between 1870 and 1910 based on architectural evidence.  It is a well-preserved example of a post-Civil War "town house".

The house was listed on the National Register of Historic Places in 1973.

See also
National Register of Historic Places listings in Craighead County, Arkansas

References

Houses on the National Register of Historic Places in Arkansas
Houses in Craighead County, Arkansas
National Register of Historic Places in Craighead County, Arkansas
Buildings and structures in Jonesboro, Arkansas